In a Quiet Room is the eleventh album released by country music artist Dan Seals and his only album on the Intersound label. This album consists mostly of acoustic versions of songs featured on earlier albums, as well as two songs — "I'd Really Love to See You Tonight" and "Love Is the Answer" — that he originally recorded as one-half of the soft rock duo England Dan & John Ford Coley. "I'd Really Love to See You Tonight" and "The Healin' Kind" were both released as singles.

Critical reception

Thom Owens of AllMusic gave the album two stars out of five, saying, "It's a pleasant album, yet it doesn't offer any new revelations or great performances." New Country magazine reviewer Rob Patterson gave the album two-and-a-half stars out of five, saying that the re-recordings were largely identical to the original versions, and that Seals occasionally sounded like a soft rock artist.

Track listing
"I'd Really Love to See You Tonight" (Parker McGee) - 2:57
 "Everything That Glitters (Is Not Gold)" (Dan Seals, Bob McDill) - 2:57
 "Big Wheels in the Moonlight" (McDill, Seals) - 3:52
 "One Friend" (Seals) - 3:14
 "Bop" (Jennifer Kimball, Paul Davis) - 3:10
 "You Still Move Me" (Seals) - 4:53
 "Love Is the Answer" (Todd Rundgren) - 4:08
 "They Rage On" (McDill, Seals) - 4:48
 "The Healin' Kind" (feat. Alison Krauss) (Ronnie Bowman, Greg Luck) - 3:02
 "Don't Believe I'd Fall in Love Again" (Seals, Rafe Van Hoy) - 3:10

References

1995 albums
Dan Seals albums